This is a list of airports in Lesotho, sorted by location.



List 
Airport names that are indicated in bold indicate that the facility has scheduled service on commercial airlines.

* not officially identified by ICAO

See also 
 Transport in Lesotho
 List of airports by ICAO code: F#FX - Lesotho
 Wikipedia: WikiProject Aviation/Airline destination lists: Africa#Lesotho

References

External links 
 Lists of airports in Lesotho:
 Great Circle Mapper
 Aircraft Charter World
 World Aero Data

 
Lesotho
Airports
Airports
Lesotho